Political relations between the State of Palestine and the United States have been complex and strained since the 1960s. While the U.S. does not recognize the State of Palestine, it recognizes the Palestine Liberation Organization (PLO) as the legitimate representative entity for the Palestinian people; following the Oslo Accords, it recognized the Palestinian National Authority as the legitimate Palestinian government of the Palestinian territories.

Due to its non-recognition of Palestine, the U.S. does not maintain any official diplomatic offices in the Palestinian territories nor does it provide consular services to Palestinians, and the Palestinians have had no diplomatic representation in the U.S. since the closure of the PLO mission in Washington, D.C., in October 2018. The U.S. designated a "Palestinian Affairs Unit" within its embassy to Israel in Jerusalem for the purpose of handling relations with the PNA, but Palestine is presently maintaining a public policy of non-cooperation with the office and with the U.S. in general. In June 2022, the "Palestinian Affairs Unit" (PAU) was renamed the "US Office of Palestinian Affairs" and will report directly to Washington "on substantive matters".

Since around 2011, the PLO's diplomatic effort has focused on the campaign known as Palestine 194, which aims to gain full membership for Palestine in the United Nations (UN). Officially, the State of Palestine seeks international recognition based on the pre-1967 borders of Israel, with East Jerusalem as its capital city. The minimal conditions set by the U.S. for the establishment of diplomatic relations with the Palestinian state are based on the Palestinians' acceptance of: UN Security Council Resolution 242, UN Security Council Resolution 338; the recognition of Israel’s right to exist; and renunciation of terrorism.

Establishing relations
The PLO, established in 1964, did not receive any official recognition from the U.S. government. However, an unofficial PLO Information Office was permitted to establish in New York in 1964 and was run by Sadat Hassan, who served as Permanent Representative of Yemen to the United Nations. It operated until 1968, when it was closed.

On May 1, 1978, the PLO was allowed to open the Palestine Information Office (PIO) in Washington DC. The PIO was registered with the Justice Department as a foreign agent. In 1987, the United States Congress adopted the Anti-Terrorism Act, which declared the PLO a terrorist organization, with a consequential ban on assisting it in any way, and the government ordered the closure of the PIO. The PIO appealed to the courts, but their objections were rejected.

In 1988 a presidential waiver was issued to allow contact with the organization. A PLO office was reopened in 1989 as the Palestine Affairs Center. The PLO Mission office in Washington D.C. was opened in 1994. Following the establishment of the Palestinian National Authority in 1994 under the Oslo Agreement, the PLO office was renamed the PLO Mission to the United States.

On 20 July 2010, the United States Department of State agreed to upgrade the status of the PLO Mission in the United States to "General Delegation of the PLO". The PLO Mission Office was ordered closed in October 2018.

Relations prior to 1988
Before the 1973 Yom Kippur War, the U.S. government considered the PLO and Fatah under Yasser Arafat's leadership as a terrorist organization, and did not support PLO aspirations at the UN. U.S. diplomats in the Middle East were explicitly ordered by the State Department never to make any contacts with Arafat or any representative on his behalf. However, despite the negative view of the PLO, State Department officials began to view the Palestinian factor as crucial enough to be taken into consideration when brokering an Israeli-Jordanian agreement on the West Bank. In contrast to the negative diplomatic view of the PLO, the intelligence community did not refrain from clandestine contacts with that entity, and as early as October 1970, a senior Fatah representative delivered the CIA message about willingness by Arafat to recognize the State of Israel in exchange for US support of a Palestinian state. This trend of clandestine contacts produced some tangible results following the Yom Kippur War. On November 3, 1973, a secret meeting was held in Morocco between Deputy Director of the CIA Vernon A. Walters and Khaled al-Hassan, number two in the PLO at the time, and the two discussed the possibility of integrating the PLO into the peace process. Even though no tangible agreement was reached at that meeting, it led to the restraint of Fatah attacks on U.S. targets.

From 1974 onward, some circles in the Department of State were considering accepting the PLO as a partner in the Middle East peace process. In June 1974, U.S. Ambassador to Egypt Herman Eilts assessed that Arafat was looking for ways to integrate the PLO into the peace process. U.S. President Gerald Ford even alluded to that possibility in October 1974. In November 1974, Ford made a non-committal statement on U.S. position towards the PLO saying: 
The Israelis have said they will never negotiate with the PLO. We are not a party for any negotiations. I think we have to let the decision as to who will negotiate to be the responsibility of the parties involved.

However, due to U.S. support of the Israeli government Washington agreed in 1975 to demand PLO explicit recognition of the State of Israel as a precondition to any dealing with its representatives. Referring to this, Ford said in November 1975:
the Palestinians do not recognize the State of Israel. And under those circumstances, it is impossible to bring the Palestinians and the Israelis together to negotiate. So, unless there is some change in their attitude, I think you can see a very serious roadblock exists.

As the PLO did not make such recognition explicitly at that time, the U.S. government refrained from any official relations and the PLO was not allowed to maintain any offices in the U.S., except for the PLO Mission to the United Nations, which was immune from U.S. law.

A certain change of attitude took place under President Jimmy Carter. Carter was the first U.S. president to advocate the creation of a Palestinian state, which he did in March 1977:
There has to be a homeland provided for the Palestinian refugees who have suffered for many, many years.
In addition to Carter's pro-Palestinian positions, the PLO leadership attempted to reach an agreement with the US government. In January 1978, Arafat delivered a secret message to Carter, stating he would settle for a Palestinian state in the West Bank and Gaza Strip in exchange for US support of that objective. The administration's relatively positive position on the PLO also allowed that organization to establish on May 1, 1978, the Palestine Information Office in Washington DC. However, no real progress on the Palestinian issue was made under Carter, as he was preoccupied with reaching an Israeli-Egyptian agreement, and contacts with PLO were detrimental to that agreement.

A harsher stance towards the PLO was taken by President Ronald Reagan. The Republican party platform approved in 1980 stated that:
Republicans reject any call for the involvement of the PLO as not in keeping with the long-term interests of either Israel or the Palestinian Arabs. The imputation of legitimacy to organizations not yet willing to acknowledge the fundamental right to existence of the State of Israel is wrong. [- - -] We believe the establishment of a Palestinian State on the West Bank would be destabilizing and harmful to the peace process.

Reagan continuously opposed the establishment of a Palestinian state or negotiating with the PLO. In September he proposed Palestinian autonomy under Jordanian supervision. Even though the plan did not call for any PLO participation, some PLO circles viewed this as a possible sign that the Reagan administration might consider accommodation with the PLO at a later date.

An attempt to close down the Palestine Information Office was made following the passage of the Anti-Terrorism Act in December 1987. This act proclaimed the PLO a terrorist organization and prohibited all of its activities except for disseminating information. Reagan then stated: 
I have no intention of establishing diplomatic relations with the PLO. 

The U.S. government attempted to close the Palestine Information Office on grounds that it was involved in terrorist activities, but various courts in the United States ruled against this line of action, but allowed stricter supervision of the office's activities.

Also, Reagan downplayed the outbreak of the Intifada, viewing it an import into the Palestinian territories rather than an expression of the Palestinian popular rebellion.

Reagan administration
The Palestine Liberation Organization published the Palestinian Declaration of Independence in November 1988, and accepted United Nations Security Council Resolutions 242 and 338, recognized Israel's right to exist, and renounced terrorism, the US conditions for an open dialogue between the PLO and the U.S. government. Reagan issued a presidential waiver to the Anti-Terrorism Act to allow contact with the PLO.

George H.W. Bush administration
The dialogue continued under President George H. W. Bush, but was suspended in June 1990 following PLO refusal to condemn an attempted attack on the Israeli coastline by the Palestine Liberation Front.

In addition, relations strained after PLO leader Arafat supported Iraq's Saddam Hussein, even after Iraq invaded Kuwait and during the 1991 Gulf War. When asked at a press conference immediately after the Gulf War about a possible dialog with the PLO, Bush stated:
To me, they've lost credibility. They've lost credibility with this office right here. And the reason they have is that they behaved very badly to those of their own fundamental faith.

However, the Bush administration made efforts throughout 1991 to convene a general Middle East peace conference. In a news conference in early August, Bush stated:
In the Middle East, we're close to convening a conference this October that will launch direct talks among Israel, the Palestinians, and the Arab States. I welcome Prime Minister Shamir's statement that he supports our proposal, and I call upon Israel and the Palestinians to clear away remaining obstacles and seize this truly historic opportunity for peace.

Bush's efforts culminated in the Madrid Peace Conference in October 1991, which for the first time accepted an official Palestinian delegation, even though without open PLO participation.

Clinton administration

President Bill Clinton altered the official U.S. position towards the PLO. He supported the goal of a Palestinian state, but refrained from expressing this in public until the closing months of his administration.

On September 10, 1993, the eve of the signing of the Oslo Agreement between the Israeli government and the PLO, Clinton announced the resumption of the U.S.-PLO dialogue, suspended in 1990. The signing ceremony of the Oslo Accord on September 13, 1993, was held in Washington D.C. in the presence of Clinton, even though negotiations for the agreement took place under the auspices of the Norwegian government. Following that ceremony, Arafat became a regular visitor to the White House, the first Palestinian leader to be accorded that honor. The U.S. government also became more involved in Israeli-Palestinian talks and invited both parties to come to Washington on certain occasions to push forward the peace process. This way, the Clinton administration brokered the Israeli-Palestinian ceasefire agreement of October 1996, and in October 1998, Clinton brokered an agreement on Israeli further redeployment in the West bank.

The Clinton administration also assisted materially to the formation of the Palestinian Authority by hosting the first donor conference for that purpose, held in Washington DC on October 1, 1993. In October 1993, Congress passed the Middle East Peace Facilitation Act of 1993, which authorized the U.S. government to monitor PLO compliance with international law.

Following the Oslo Agreement and the establishment of the Palestinian National Authority in 1994, the PLO office was upgraded and renamed the PLO Mission to the United States.

The U.S. government took an active part in lending technical assistance in building the institutions of the Palestinian Authority. On March 30, 1994, Clinton ordered the allocation of $4 million for the construction of a Palestinian police force, and on March 16, 1995 ordered additional $5 million to be allocated towards the same purpose. In July 1995, U.S. Congress passed the Middle East Peace Facilitation Act of 1995, which authorized the President to withhold funds from the Palestinian Authority in cases of what it viewed as in compliance with commitments made to the Israeli government under the Oslo Agreement. In December 1998, President Bill Clinton became the first U.S. president to visit the Palestinian Authority.

George W. Bush administration

U.S. attitudes towards the Palestinian Authority changed following the inauguration of President George W. Bush. President Bush refrained from meeting Arafat, and refrained from referring to him as "President Arafat", as Palestinian officials insisted, but only as "Chairman Arafat". During the first year of his administration, Bush maintained relations with the Palestinian Authority on the technical level only. Following another round of violence in the Palestinian territories, in June 2002 Bush expressed support for a Palestinian state following a process of negotiations. On June 3, 2003, Bush met for the first time Palestinian prime minister Mahmoud Abbas at a multilateral conference at Sharm el-Sheikh, a format of meeting designed to avoid a direct meeting with Arafat, now viewed negatively by Bush and the Israeli leadership. On July 25, 2003, Abbas visited the White House for the first time. At that meeting, the two leaders established the Palestine Economic Development Group, a high level joint American-Palestinian committee to overlook economic ties.

Following Arafat's death in November 2004, the new Palestinian president Abbas became a regular visitor to the White House. Bush now referred to him in official communications as "President" instead of "Chairman", as was done with Arafat. Abbas visited the White House while receiving the honors of a head of state on six occasions between 2005 and 2008. During the visit of May 26, 2005, Bush stated his support for the parameters of the Palestinian state: 
Any final status agreement must be reached between the two parties, and changes to the 1949 Armistice Lines must be mutually agreed to. A viable two-state solution must ensure contiguity on the West Bank, and a state of scattered territories will not work. There must also be meaningful linkages between the West Bank and Gaza. This is the position of the United States today; it will be the position of the United States at the time of final status negotiations.

Concerning the internal structure of the Palestinian Authority, Bush supported the Israeli demand for holding new presidential elections in January 2005 and parliamentary elections in January 2006. In January 2008 President George W. Bush visited the Palestinian Authority.

Obama administration

Relations improved under President Barack Obama. From the beginning of his administration, Obama pledged his support for the establishment of a Palestinian state. Abbas visited the White House on at least four occasions between 2009 and 2014. In July 2010 the PLO mission was upgraded and renamed PLO General Delegation to the United States.

During fiscal year 2011, the U.S. government gave the Palestinian Authority $200 million in direct budget support.

Tension in US-Palestinian relations 
In 2011, relations worsened as the Palestinians sought UN membership for a Palestinian state, which the US government and Israel regarded as a unilateral act. Obama told Abbas that the US would veto any UN Security Council move to recognize Palestinian statehood. The Palestinian efforts shifted to the UN General Assembly, which voted in November 2012 to admit Palestine as an observer state, while the US voted against the resolution, and has continued not to recognise Palestine as a state.

Despite the passage on November 29, 2012, of the UN General Assembly resolution recognizing Palestine as a non-member observer state, Obama visited the Palestinian Authority for the first time as a President in March 2013.  Then-Vice President Biden also visited the Palestinian Authority twice.

Trump administration

The Trump administration adopted a general stance of support for Israeli positions. On May 3, 2017, Palestinian President Abbas visited the White House for the first time during the Trump administration. According to Bob Woodward, citing as his source  Rex Tillerson, Trump's early support for Israel wavered: he  had begun to wonder whether Netanyahu might not be the major obstacle to a peace agreement between Israel and the Palestinians. Netanyahu then asked him, 'And that's the guy you want to help?'. Trump was outraged by what he saw. After their meeting ended, Rex Tillerson was called in and shown the same material, a  'crudely forged video', and told the president the clips looked like fabrications. Trump remained convinced they were authentic. On the following day, at his meeting with Abbas in Bethlehem, Trump then lashed out at the Palestinian leader, calling him a liar and murderer. Woodward appears to  suggest that this disinformation was behind Trump's decision to close the PLO office in Washington and cut off aid to the organization. This occasion, on May 23, was Trump's first encounter with the Palestinian Authority.

On December 6, 2017, Trump announced the U.S.'s recognition of Jerusalem as the capital of Israel, a move condemned by Abbas, who described it as indicating US withdrawal from its mediation role.

On September 10, 2018, Trump ordered the closure of the Palestinian office in Washington D.C., citing the PLO's lack of progress in the peace process. Despite condemnation, the mission was closed on October 11, 2018.

On October 18, 2018, United States Secretary of State Mike Pompeo announced that the U.S. Consulate-General in Jerusalem would be merged into the U.S. Embassy in Jerusalem. Pompeo announced that the US would continue to conduct relations with the Palestinians through a special Palestinian Affairs Unit inside the Embassy. This announcement was criticized by Palestinian officials including Palestinian Authority chief negotiator Saeb Erekat as an endorsement of the Israeli claim to Jerusalem and "Greater Israel."

On January 31, 2019, the U.S. confirmed it stopped all aid to Palestinians following a request from the Palestinians to do so for fear of future court actions against them as a result of the Anti-Terrorism Clarification Act allowing Americans to sue those receiving foreign aid in US for “acts of war”.

On March 4, 2019, the Consulate-General ceased operating as an independent mission and was revamped as the Palestinian Affairs Unit, which will report to the Embassy. In response, Saeb Erekat, the secretary-general of the PLO's Executive Committee called for the international community to boycott the new Palestinian Affairs Unit, regarding it as a "downgrade" and "assault" on the peace process. Another Palestinian official Hanan Ashrawi claimed that the merger of the Consulate General into the Embassy represented an assault on Palestinian rights and identity.

Speaking to the UN Security Council in October 2019, US Ambassador to the United Nations Kelly Craft called Hamas "a terrorist organization that oppresses the Palestinian people in Gaza through intimidation and outright violence, while inciting violence against Israel." She condemned as "despicable"  Hamas's violence against its own people, its use of Palestinian children as pawns, and its indiscriminate attacks on Israeli civilian areas, and called it one of the greatest obstacles to resolving the Israeli-Palestinian conflict.

In November 2019, Donald Trump rejected the request by Benjamin Netanyahu to allow the transfer of $12 million to the security forces of Palestine Authority (PA). The request was made after the US State Department amid its aid cuts to the Palestinians realized that the amount in aid to PA forces was neither stopped nor transferred.

Biden administration

The Biden administration announced on January 26, 2021, that it would restore relations with Palestine and provide aid to Palestinians.

On May 25, 2021, Secretary of State Antony Blinken announced that the U.S. would reopen its Palestinian consulate in Jerusalem, but no specific date was given.

In June 2022, the "Palestinian Affairs Unit" (PAU) was renamed the "US Office of Palestinian Affairs" and will report directly to Washington "on substantive matters".

PLO heads of mission
The PLO office in Washington DC was headed by the following:
 Hatem Hussieni (1978–1982)
 Hassan Abdel Rahman (1982–1991)
 Anees Barghouti (1991–1993)
 Hassan Abdel Rahman (2nd time, 1993–2005)
 Afif Safieh (2005–2008)
 Nabil Abu Zneid (Charge D'Affaires, 2008–2009)
 Maen Rashid Areikat (2009–2017)
 Husam Zomlot (2017–2018)

See also

 Foreign relations of the United States
 Foreign relations of Palestine
 International recognition of Palestine
 American Palestine Public Affairs Forum

Notes

Further reading
 Mohamed Rabie, U.S.-PLO Dialogue: Secret Diplomacy and Conflict Resolution (Gainesville: University Press of Florida, 1995)

External links
U.S. Attempts at Peace between Israel and Palestine from the Dean Peter Krogh Foreign Affairs Digital Archives
PLO Delegation - Washington, DC
 Consulate General of U.S.A. - Jerusalem
E-Consulate of U.S.A. - Gaza
 Palestinians and Middle East Peace: Issues for the United States
 U.S. Foreign Aid to the Palestinians
 W.M. Reisman, "An International Farce: The Sad Case of the PLO Mission" Yale Journal of International Law, vol. 14(1989) pp. 412-432

 
United States
Bilateral relations of the United States